William R. Hand (5 July 1898 – ) was an English professional footballer, who played in the Football League for Crystal Palace as a forward. He also played non-league football for Sutton Town.

Playing career
Hand began his career with Sutton Town, and was signed by Crystal Palace in October 1920. He made 100 league appearances (15 goals) for Palace between then and October 1925 when his contract, along with that of Dick Strang, was cancelled due to breach of contract.

References

External links
Bill Hand at holmesdale.net

1898 births
Year of death missing
People from Codnor
Footballers from Derbyshire
Sutton Town A.F.C. players
Crystal Palace F.C. players
English footballers
Association football forwards
English Football League players